Wayne Westmark (born December 15, 1932) was the sergeant-at-arms of the House of Representatives of the U.S. state of Florida from 1976 until his retirement in 1998. He received his bachelor's degree from the Florida State University in 1958. He currently lives near Tallahassee, Florida.

External links
Florida House resolution commending Sergeant at Arms, Wayne Westmark, upon his retirement in 1998
Official Bio

1932 births
Living people
Florida State University alumni
People from Pensacola, Florida
Pensacola Junior College alumni
Mississippi State University alumni